Orange marmalade is a marmalade made from oranges, it may also refer to:

Orange Marmalade, a South Korean webtoon
Orange Marmalade (TV series), a South Korean drama series based on the webtoon
Grevillea 'Orange Marmalade', a grevillea cultivar